Woodstock Country Club is a historic country club and national historic district located at Indianapolis, Indiana.  It was developed between 1923 and 1956 and includes the 1923 Colonial Revival clubhouse expanded in 1957 and 1988.  It consists of a central block with flanking wings and a three-arch porte cochere.  Also on the property are the contributing main swimming pool (1927, 1996) and upper and lower tennis courts (c. 1900, c. 1922).  The golf course was originally designed in 1899 and reconstructed in 1927-1928 by Bill Diddel.

It was listed on the National Register of Historic Places in 2007.

References

Historic districts on the National Register of Historic Places in Indiana
Colonial Revival architecture in Indiana
Clubhouses on the National Register of Historic Places
Historic districts in Indianapolis
National Register of Historic Places in Indianapolis
Woodstock